The 2020 season is FC Seoul's 37th season in the K League 1.

Pre-season
 In Algarve, Portugal: From 30 December 2019 to 21 January 2020

Pre-season match results

Competitions

Overview

K League 1

League table

Results summary

Results by round

Matches

Relegation group

Group table
<noinclude>

Matches

FA Cup

AFC Champions League

Tables

Results

Match reports and match highlights
Fixtures and Results at FC Seoul Official Website

Season statistics

K League 1 records

All competitions records

Attendance records

 Season total attendance is K League 1, FA Cup, and AFC Champions League combined

Squad statistics

Goals

Assists

Coaching staff

Choi Yong-soo era (~30 July 2020)

Kim Ho-younr era (30 July 2020–24 September 2020)

Park Hyuk-soon era (25 September 2020~12 November 2020)

Lee Won-jun era (13 November 2020~3 December 2020)

Players

Team squad
All players registered for the 2020 season are listed.

Out on loan and military service

Note: Where a player has not declared an international allegiance, nation is determined by place of birth.
※ In: Transferred from other teams in the middle of the season.
※ Out: Transferred to other teams in the middle of the season.
※ Discharged: Transferred from Sanjgu Sangmu for military service in the middle of the season (registered in 2020 season).
※ Conscripted: Transferred to Sanjgu Sangmu for military service after the end of the season.

Transfers

Tactics

Tactical analysis

Starting eleven and formation

Substitutes

See also
 FC Seoul

References

External links
 FC Seoul official website 

FC Seoul seasons
Seoul